White Rose is an Indonesian pop punk band from Denpasar, Bali, formed in 2007 and reformed again in 2014. They consist of guitarist and vocalist Surya Dipta, lead guitarist Ian Putra, bassist Adi 'Goib' Krisna, and drummer Satria Priangga. They have released the ‘Buktikan ‘Ku Bisa EP’ in 2012, and followed with their debut full-length album ‘Buka Mata Mereka’ in May 2015.

Discography

Studio albums 

 Buktikan 'Ku Bisa EP (2012, Self-released)
 Buka Mata Mereka (2015, Heartless Records)
 Sentimental (2018, H.M.V.U Collective Records)

Music video 

 "Takkan Pernah Padam" (Buka Mata Mereka, 2015)
 "Nol Derajat" (Buka Mata Mereka, 2015)
 "Serenade" (Sentimental, 2018)

Band members

Current members 

 Surya Dipta — vocals, guitar (2007–present)
 Ian Putra — guitar (2014–present)
 Adi 'Goib' Krisna — bass guitar (2014–present)
 Satria Priangga — drums (2015–present)

Past members 

 Gung Nandha — drums (2007-2015)
 Riga Pradiska — bass guitar (2007-2013)

References

External links 
 http://www.whiterosepoppunk.com

Indonesian pop music groups
Indonesian punk rock groups
Musical groups established in 2007
Musical groups disestablished in 2013
Musical groups reestablished in 2014
2007 establishments in Indonesia